Bile salt-dependent lipase (or BSDL), also known as carboxyl ester lipase (or CEL) is an enzyme produced by the adult pancreas and aids in the digestion of fats. Bile salt-stimulated lipase (or BSSL) is an equivalent enzyme found within breast milk. BSDL has been found in the pancreatic secretions of all species in which it has been looked for. BSSL, originally discovered in the milk of humans and various other primates, has since been found in the milk of many animals including dogs, cats, rats, and rabbits.

Enzymatic activity
More than 95% of the fat present in human milk and in infant formulas is in the form of triacylglycerols (TG). 
In adults, TGs are thought to be broken down or hydrolyzed mainly by the colipase-dependent lipase (CDL) enzyme. In the newborn, CDL activity in the duodenum is lower than in adults.

Both BSDL and BSSL have a broad substrate specificity and, like CDL, are capable of hydrolyzing triacylglycerides (in addition to phospholipids, esters of cholesterol, and lipid-soluble vitamins). In particular, they can hydrolyze esters of the essential fatty acids (n-3 and n-6 PUFAs) and DHA. BSDL production in the newborn pancreas is quite low when compared with production in the mammary gland or adult pancreas.

However, newborn infants absorb lipids relatively well, considering the low level of CDL and BSDL they produce. This observation has led to the suggestion that BSDL produced by lactating mammary gland and present within milk, may compensate for the low levels of other TG-digesting enzymes and aid newborns in lipid absorption.
The importance of BSSL in breast milk for the preterm infant nutrition was suggested at 2007.
It was also directly shown recently.

References

Further reading

External links
 
 
 

Milk
Enzymes